The Akaflieg München Mü15 was a two-seat glider designed and built in  Germany in the late 1930s, loosely based on the Mü10. A longer span version, the Akaflieg München Mü20 was still in the design stages when further work was abandoned.

Development 
Germany had established Akademische Fliegerschule at several universities after World War I. The first and lead group was established in Berlin, but one of the most prolific, up to World War II, was Akaflieg München.

The Akaflieg München Mü15 was a high-performance, two-seat glider loosely based on the Akaflieg München Mü10 Milan, with flaps and a retractable main undercarriage. Following a similar construction method to the early Akaflieg München gliders, the Mü15 was constructed using a welded steel tube fuselage covered by wooden longerons with aircraft fabric covering and conventional wooden wings, with plywood skinning back to the main spar and fabric aft. The trailing edges of the wings were taken up by steel-framed fabric covered flaps and ailerons, all deflectable to improve thermalling and approach control. DFS style spoilers, on upper and lower surfaces, were fitted for approach control. The Mü15 had long-span wings, a long fuselage with a large fin and rudder. This arrangement from Egon Scheibe became known as the Schüle München - Munich School. The pilot sat forward of the wing under a long built-up canopy, affording excellent visibility. In contrast, the instructor/passenger sat with their head between the wing leading edges, relying on windows either side of the fuselage under the wings for visibility.

Mü20
A longer-span, version of the Mü15 was still in the design stages when further work was abandoned.

Operational history
Like the single-seat Mü13, the performance of the sole Mü15 (D-14-250) was regarded as particularly good, with a glide ratio of 29:1 and the ability to fly at relatively high speeds, due to the slender 'Scheibe Mü' aerofoil section. First flown in 1940, at Ainring in Austria, this aircraft was equipped for blind flying, but had very poor roll response, requiring large application of the oversized rudder to complete turns with much skid. Flown until the exigencies of World War II intervened, the Mü15 had flown a total of 45 hours when flying ceased in November 1941.

Variants 
Akaflieg München Mü15 Loosely based on the Mü 10 with  span wings, flaps and a mainwheel.
Akaflieg München Mü20 Further development of the Mü10/Mü15 line with a  span wings and  all-up weight. Design of the Mü20 was almost complete when work was abandoned.

Specifications (Mü15)

References

1940s German sailplanes
Mü15
High-wing aircraft
Aircraft first flown in 1940